Alvino Volpi Neto (born 1 August 1992), commonly known as Neto Volpi, is a Brazilian professional footballer who plays as a goalkeeper for Peñarol of the Uruguayan Primera División.

Career
Neto Volpi began his career playing for Figueirense's youth sides. In 2014, Santo André announced it had signed Volpi on loan.

He returned to Santa Catarina, his home state, after joining Inter de Lages for the 2016 season. Neto Volpi eventually became the club's first-stringer goalkeeper in all three tournaments Inter de Lages played throughout the season – Campeonato Catarinense, Copa do Brasil and Campeonato Brasileiro Série D.

Afterwards, he signed with América de Cali. Neto Volpi currently plays for Shimizu S-Pulse earning £3,000 per week.

Honours
Santo André
Copa Paulista: 2014

Figueirense
Campeonato Catarinense: 2018

América de Cali
Primera A (Finalización): 2019

Peñarol
 Uruguayan Primera División: 2021

Individual
Best goalkeeper of Primera A (Apertura): 2019

Personal life

He is cousin of São Paulo FC goalkeeper Tiago Volpi.

References

External links

Inter de Lages' players 

1992 births
Living people
Brazilian footballers
Brazilian people of Italian descent
Sportspeople from Santa Catarina (state)
Figueirense FC players
Esporte Clube Internacional de Lages players
Clube Atlético Tubarão players
América de Cali footballers
Deportivo Pasto footballers
Shimizu S-Pulse players
Peñarol players
J1 League players
Categoría Primera A players
Campeonato Brasileiro Série A players
Uruguayan Primera División players
Brazilian expatriate footballers
Expatriate footballers in Colombia
Expatriate footballers in Japan
Expatriate footballers in Uruguay
Association football goalkeepers